Ilyas Yakoub also spelled as Ilyas Ya'kub (14 June 1903 – 2 August 1958) was an Indonesian journalist. He is now regarded as a National Hero of Indonesia.

References

1903 births
1958 deaths
Indonesian journalists
National Heroes of Indonesia